Metallothionein-1B is a protein that in humans is encoded by the MT1B gene.

References

Further reading